Sture Lindén (born 27 August 1942) is a Swedish curler.

Teams

References

External links
 
Jättebragden i Kanada största ögonblicket för 60-årsfirande Djursholms CK
Svensk Curling nr 2-3 2013 by Svenska Curlingförbundet - issuu
Duck Soup 1979-80 - Ardsley Curling Club (look at "Sture Linden")

Living people
1942 births
Swedish male curlers
Swedish curling champions